The 1912–13 Prima Categoria season was won by Pro Vercelli.

For the first time, sides from southern Italy were admitted.

Regulation 
Football in Italy expanded its popularity during the 10’s, but the expedition of the Italian football team to the Stockholm Olympics had a disappointing very poor result. In summer 1912, minor clubs took control over the Italian Football Federation, and imposed a championship reform. New vicepresidents Mr.Valvassori and Mr.Faroppa created a new format with more clubs but more groups, regionalising the tournament.

The round robin was abolished. The old main tournament was split in two groups of six clubs, with solely ten matchdays, while the Oriental group became a full member of the championship.

Best two clubs of each group went to the final group. Last clubs should be relegated.

An experimental Southern section was introduced.

Pre-league qualifications

For Piedmont group
Played on October 20, 1912, in Turin.

Novara was promoted.

For Lombardy-Liguria group

Round 1
Played on October 20, 1912.

The match between Lambro Milano and Racing Libertas Milano was later canceled and repeated:

Repetition
Played on October 27, 1912.

Round 2
Played on November 1, 1912.

Racing Libertas was promoted.

For Latium group

Round 1
Played on October 20, 1912.

Round 2
Played on October 27, 1912.

Verdicts
Novara, Racing Libertas Milan, Alba Roma, Juventus Audax Roma and Pro Roma were admitted to the 1a Categoria. The losers went to regional 2nd Category Promotion.

Main tournament

Piedmont

Classification

Results table

Liguria-Lombardy

Classification

Results table

Veneto-Emilia

Classification

Results table

Final round
The results of the matches between sides that were in the same qualification rounds were valid also for the final round (but not the goals scored in those matches). Due to this, the sides began the final round with a point bonus:
 Pro Vercelli: 3 points
 Milan, Genoa, Hellas Verona, Vicenza: 2 points
 Casale: 1 point

Classification

Note:solely 8 matches really played instead of 10.

Results table
Pro Vercelli advanced to National Final.

Central-Southern Italy tournament

Tuscany 

Virtus Juventusque advanced to Central Final.

Lazio 

Lazio advanced to Central Final.

Campania (Southern Final)

First Leg

Second Leg 

Naples won 5–3 on aggregate, advanced to Central-Southern Final.

Central Final

First Leg

Second Leg 

Lazio won 6–1 on aggregate, advanced to Central-Southern Final.

Central-Southern Final

First Leg

Second Leg 

Lazio won 3–2 on aggregate, advanced to the National Final.

National final
Played on 1 June 1913, in Genoa.

References

1912-13
Italy